Ciao Bella (Italian for "Hello and/or Goodbye beautiful") is a Canadian television sitcom that debuted on CBC Television in the 2004–05 television season.

Set in Montreal, Quebec, the series centres on Elena Battista (Claudia Ferri), a young, single Italian-Canadian woman whose desire for a modern lifestyle conflicts with the traditional values of her family. In the season premiere, she is hit by a bus on the way to the florist to exchange a corsage on her sister's wedding day. In the ensuing coma, she promises God that if she is allowed to live, she will take advantage of her life and live it on her own terms instead of letting her family run it for her.

Steve Galluccio, who created the series, explored similar themes in the theatrical play Mambo Italiano. Ferri appeared in the film adaptation of that play as a different character.

Each episode was filmed twice, in both English and French, with no dubbing. The French version aired on Télévision de Radio-Canada.

Cast 
 Claudia Ferri as Elena Batista
 Ellen David as Sophia Batista
 Tony Calabretta as Edwardo Batista
 Jessica Heafey as Carmie Batista
 Peter Miller as Elio Lanza
 Carl Alacchi as Uncle Nunzio
 Dorothée Berryman as Theresa Lanza
 Louis Philippe Dandenault as Ernie
 Johnny Falcone as Maurizio

References

External links 
 

CBC Television original programming
Ici Radio-Canada Télé original programming
2004 Canadian television series debuts
2005 Canadian television series endings
Television shows set in Montreal
Works about Italian-Canadian culture
2000s Canadian sitcoms